Tibideaux may refer to:

Elvin Tibideaux, a fictional character in The Cosby Show
Carmen Tibideaux, a fictional character in Glee